Boconnoc Church is a Grade I listed Church of England parish church in Boconnoc, Cornwall.

History and description
The church dates from the 13th to 15th century, but was the subject of a substantial restoration in 1873. It consists of a nave, a south aisle and porch, a north chapel and, in the south west of the church, "a turret instead of a true tower".

It contains a 15th-century font. The tower of 1877 has five sides in the lower part and eight in the upper. Features of interest include a musicians' gallery, the altar table made by Sir Reginald Mohun (1621), the Jacobean pulpit, and a monument to the wife of Will Drew.

The church was placed onto the National Heritage List for England in August 1964.

Parish status
The church is in a joint benefice with:
St Brevita’s Church, Lanlivery
St Winnow’s Church, St Winnow
St Cyricius and St Julietta’s Church, St Veep
St Mary the Virgin's Church, Braddock
St Nectan’s Chapel, St Winnow
St Bartholomew's Church, Lostwithiel

Monuments
Penelope Mohun (d. 1637)

References

Church of England church buildings in Cornwall
14th-century church buildings in England
Grade I listed churches in Cornwall